Khozu Avia is a private airline established in 2002 and based in Almaty, Kazakhstan operating charter and business flights from its bases of Almaty Airport and Nur-Sultan Airport.

Fleet

Current fleet 
The Khozu Avia fleet includes the following aircraft (as of August 2018):

Former fleet 
Khozu Avia formerly operated:

Notes

References

Airlines of Kazakhstan
Airlines established in 2002